Georges Berger (1 May 1897 – 16 November 1952) was a French gymnast who competed in the 1920 Summer Olympics.

References

1897 births
1952 deaths
French male artistic gymnasts
Olympic gymnasts of France
Gymnasts at the 1920 Summer Olympics
Olympic bronze medalists for France
Olympic medalists in gymnastics
Medalists at the 1920 Summer Olympics
20th-century French people